David Kostelecký (born May 12, 1975, in Brno, Czechoslovakia,) is a male Czech sports shooter. He won the gold medal in the Men's Trap event at the 2008 Summer Olympics and the silver medal in the same event at the 2020 Summer Olympics.

Sports career 
He started shooting after receiving an air rifle from his grandfather, a hunter, and following his older brother. Being a junior, he was labeled unperspective, as he stated in 2021.

Nevertheless, in 1993, Kostelecký won a bronze medal at the European junior championships in his home Brno. He won junior world championships in 1995 in Nicosia, where he finished second in the European championships in 1995, starting his senior championships medal collection. In 1996, he participated in his first Olympics, finishing 31st in the qualification round behind both his compatriots (Jiří Gach finished eighth and Pavel Kubec 13th).

In 2002 he became European champion in Lonato taking advantage from the basic round result of 122 and keeping off Marco Venturini in the final. It was the first individual European gold in trap for any Czech shooter. He also finished second in the 2006 ISSF World Cup final. 

After adding silver in 2011 and bronze in 2014, Kostelecký won his second European championships title in 2017 in Baku.

Personal life 
Kostelecký married Slovak shooter Lenka Barteková in 2010, a year later their son Daniel was born.

Olympic results

Records

References

External links

1975 births
Living people
Czech male sport shooters
Olympic shooters of the Czech Republic
Shooters at the 1996 Summer Olympics
Shooters at the 2000 Summer Olympics
Shooters at the 2008 Summer Olympics
Shooters at the 2012 Summer Olympics
Shooters at the 2016 Summer Olympics
Shooters at the 2020 Summer Olympics
Olympic gold medalists for the Czech Republic
Olympic silver medalists for the Czech Republic
World record holders in shooting
Sportspeople from Brno
Trap and double trap shooters
Olympic medalists in shooting
Medalists at the 2008 Summer Olympics
Medalists at the 2020 Summer Olympics
Shooters at the 2015 European Games
Shooters at the 2019 European Games
European Games medalists in shooting
European Games gold medalists for the Czech Republic